The Battle of Qara-Derrah Pass was fought between Pir Muhammad of the Timurid Empire and Qara Yusuf of the Turcoman Kara Koyunlu confederation in eastern Turkey near Lake Van in 1395.

Background
When the Ilkhanate collapsed after the death of Abu Sa'id Bahadur Khan, rival Mongol tribes, namely the Chopanids, Jalayirids and Injuids along with a Persian clan, the Muzaffarids, were involved in conflicts for dominance over Iraq, Iran, Azerbaijan, Armenia and Georgia. This rendered them weak and ideal targets for an invasion by Timur the Lame in 1393. He overran these territories and sacked portions of eastern Anatolia. But Timur's prolonged absence from his homeland began to worry his nobles and family members and so he sent his grandson Pir Muhammad (son of Umar Shaikh Mirza I) to Shiraz in 1395 to provide security in that part of his dominions.

Pir Muhammad departed accordingly for Shiraz accompanied by Ghiyasuddin Tarkhan and Amir Shams-ud-din Abbas, who was to move on with his forces to Transoxiana. Having reached Ardabil, they received intelligence that Qara Yusuf at the head of Kara Koyunlu of superior force was encamped in the neighbourhood of Alahtauk with the design of making an attempt on Khoy.

Ghiyasuddin Tarkhan and Amir Shams-ud-din Abbas continued their march for Samarkand while Pir Muhammad made the best of his way to Tabriz in order to assemble the troops of the province and he was shortly afterwards joined at that place by several officers sent by Miran Shah as reinforcements.

Battle
Pir Muhammad advanced without further delay to oppose the designs of Qara Yusuf and reached a particular spot without confrontation. He became aware that a detachment of the enemy sent forward by the Kara Koyunlu chief to explore and scour the country had taken post in the Qara-Derrah Pass, a strong defile in the mountains which at a subsequent period formed the boundary between the Turkish and Persian dominions. With equal promptitude and decision, the young prince resolved on an attempt to cut off this detachment and accordingly coming upon them with a suddenness which precluded resistance. All those who could escape fled to the Bendimahi river which flows into the Lake Van.

Qara Yusuf immediately relocated his headquarters and withdrew in dismay on intelligence that the Timurids were approaching. Pir Muhammad came upon the fugitives the town of Bendimahi and from there dispatched a part of his force in pursuit of Qara Yusuf.

Aftermath
Qara Yusuf having disappeared without leaving a vestige to indicate the course of his flight, it was thought advisable to terminate the pursuit and Pir Muhammad, being at liberty to resume his march for Shiraz, now proceeded to Soltaniyeh.

References

External links

Battles in medieval Anatolia
Qara-Derrah Pass
Qara-Derrah Pass
1395 in Asia
History of Van Province
1390s in the Middle East
Battles involving the Kara Koyunlu